HSC Rapid Link Jet is a high-speed ferry operated by Seajets and operated on Stena Line's Holyhead - Dún Laoghaire route and seasonally on the Fishguard - Rosslare service. She was marketed by Stena Line as the Stena Express. In 2019 was sold by Seajets and now is laid-up in Perama, Greece.

Design and construction
Rapid Link Jet was built in 1996 by Incat in Australia, and is one of a series of wave-piercing catamarans to be constructed by the company. Construction began in May 1995 and was completed in May 1996.

Career
She briefly served on the English Channel for P&O Stena Line as HSC Elite.

In 1998 she was transferred to Stena Line's Fishguard - Rosslare service and renamed Stena Lynx III. She has since operated this route on a seasonal basis, spending the winter laid-up, usually in Birkenhead. Stena Line purchased the vessel in 2004. The same year, she developed some serious technical problems, and spent a large part of the summer season out of service.

She returned to her seasonal role on the southern Irish Sea on 14 May 2009, for another summer operating alongside the Stena Europe.

She operated the Holyhead - Dún Laoghaire route running twice daily from 15 March 2010 until the end of May 2010, when the HSC Stena Explorer operated the route with one round trip per day.

She was then laid up in Dún Laoghaire until 29 June 2010 when the vessel moved to Rosslare. She operated her seasonal summer route from 10 July 2010 until September 2010.

On 15 September 2010, she once again returned to operate the Holyhead-Dún Laoghaire service, after the HSS Stena Explorer was withdrawn from the route for the winter season of 2010. She operated the route until Sunday, 9 January 2011, in which she then had her 2011 refit. She then returned to Holyhead, before moving to Dún Laoghaire for lay up until June 2011.

At the end of June 2011, she left Dún Laoghaire to begin her summer seasonal service on the Rosslare - Fishguard route. She began her summer service on the Rosslare - Fishguard route on Friday 1 July, and ended on Sunday 4 September 2011, she then returned to Dún Laoghaire for lay up.

In October 2011 the Stena Lynx III was renamed Sunflower 2. While en route to Asia she suffered a major engine failure in the Bay of Biscay, after this incident she was repaired in La Coruna.

In 2016 she operated in Korea with the new name Orange 1. In 2017 it was chartered by the Government of Trinidad & Tobago for service on the inter-island service between Scarborough and Port of Spain.

In 2019 renamed Rapid Link Jet was sold by Seajets and now is laid-up in Perama, Greece.

References

Ships of Seajets
Ferries of the United Kingdom
Ferries of the Republic of Ireland
Incat high-speed craft
1996 ships
Ships built by Incat